Malta participated in the 1968 Summer Paralympics in Tel Aviv. The country sent six representatives (four men and two women) to compete in athletics and table tennis. For the first time, Maltese competitors failed to win a medal.

See also
Malta at the 1968 Summer Olympics

References

Nations at the 1968 Summer Paralympics
1968
Paralympics